= The Tightrope Dancer =

Painting by Henri de Toulouse-Lautrec

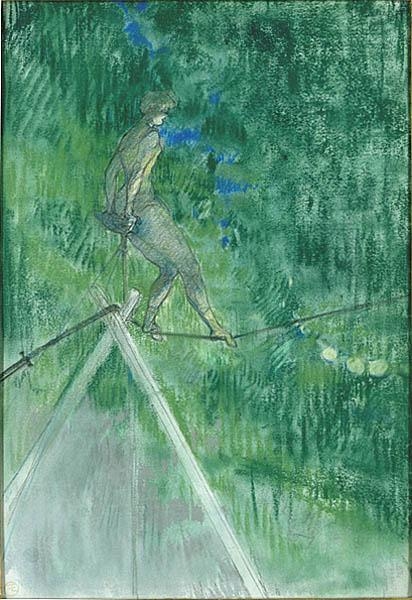
- Artist: Henri de Toulouse-Lautrec
- Year: 1899
- Medium: Pastel on paper
- Dimensions: 47 cm × 32 cm (19 in × 13 in)
- Location: Nationalmuseum, Stockholm

The Tightrope Dancer is an 1899 pastel painting by Henri de Toulouse-Lautrec, now in the Nationalmuseum, in Stockholm.

== History and description ==
In early 1899, after Toulouse-Lautrec had another attack of delirium tremens, his mother insisted for him to be admitted to a psychiatric hospital near Paris, in Neuilly-sur-Seine. Lautrec was treated there from February 27 to May 17, 1899. Physicians at the time believed that one of the symptoms of the disease was memory loss. Toulouse-Lautrec, in order to convince them of his recovery, on the advice of a friend, began to paint scenes from the life of the circus from memory. This is how the current pastel was created.

The work, like others from the circus series that he created during his time in the hospital, was painted exclusively from memory. Unlike the artist's earlier works, which often represent a fleeting impression, here it his shown a detailed and thoughtful composition, both in form and in content.

== Provenance ==
The Tightrope Dancer was acquired by the Nationalmuseum of Sweden in 1968, where it remains. From September 17, 2011 to February 19, 2012, the painting was on display at the National Gallery of Denmark, in Copenhagen, as part of the exhibition "Toulouse-Lautrec. The Human Comedy".
